This article represents the structure of the Irish Defence Forces as of May 2020:

Chief of staff 
Chief of staff is a three-star general rank, and the holder of this post has authority and responsibility in respect to all staff duties relating to the management of the Irish Defence Forces.

 Chief of staff, in Newbridge
 Chief of Staff's Division, headed by the assistant chief of staff, based in Newbridge
 Office of the Chief of Staff
 Office of the Assistant Chief of Staff
 Strategic Planning Branch
 Public Relations Branch
 The Military Judge
 Operations Division, headed by the deputy chief of staff operations, based in Newbridge and Dublin
 Office of the Deputy Chief of Staff Operations
 J2 Intelligence Branch
 J3 & J5 Planning & Operations Branch
 Combat Support Branch
 J6 CIS Branch
 Defence Forces Headquarters CIS Company
 J7 Training Branch
 Support Division, headed by the Deputy Chief of Staff Support, based in Newbridge and Dublin
 Office of the Deputy Chief of Staff Support
 J1 Human Resources Management Branch
 J4 Logistics
 CAOGA
 Conciliation & Arbitration (Mil)
 Transport Branch
 Legal Services Branch
 Engineers Branch
 Ordnance Branch
 Medical Branch
 Military Police Branch
 Military Chaplaincy Service
 Military Police Government Buildings Company, in Dublin

Army 

The Army is the land warfare branch of the Irish Defence Forces and consists of two brigades, a training centre, providing training to all the defense forces, and other units, including musical units.

  Army Headquarters, in Dublin
 Army Ranger Wing, in Curragh
 1st Mechanised Infantry Company, in Curragh
 1st Armoured Cavalry Squadron, in Curragh
 Defence Forces School of Music, in Dublin
 Army No 1 Band, in Dublin
 Band of the 1st Brigade, in Cork
 Band of the 2nd Brigade, in Dublin
 Equitation School, in Dublin

1st Brigade 

The 1st Brigade is headquartered at Collins Barracks in Cork. The brigade is responsible for the counties of Carlow, Clare, Cork, Galway, Kerry, Kilkenny, Laois, Limerick, Offaly, Tipperary, Waterford, and Wexford.

  1st Brigade, in Cork
 1st Infantry Battalion, in Galway
 3rd Infantry Battalion, in Kilkenny
 12th Infantry Battalion, in Limerick
 1st Artillery Regiment, in Cork, with L118/119 105mm light guns and 120mm mortars
 1st Cavalry Squadron, in Cork
 1st Engineer Group, in Cork
 1st Supply and Transport Group, in Cork
 1st Ordnance Group, in Cork
 1st Field CIS Company, in Cork
 1st Military Police Company, in Cork

2nd Brigade 

The 2nd Brigade is headquartered at the Cathal Brugha Barracks in Dublin. The brigade is responsible for the counties of Cavan, Donegal, Dublin, Kildare, Leitrim, Longford, Louth, Mayo, Meath, Monaghan, Roscommon, Sligo, Westmeath, and Wicklow.

  2nd Brigade, in Dublin
 6th Infantry Battalion, in Athlone
 7th Infantry Battalion, in Dublin
 27th Infantry Battalion, in Dundalk
 28th Infantry Battalion, in Ballyshannon
 2nd Artillery Regiment, in Athlone, with L118/119 105mm light guns and 120mm mortars
 2nd Cavalry Squadron, in Dublin
 2nd Engineer Group, in Athlone
 2nd Supply and Transport Group, in Athlone
 2nd Ordnance Group, in Athlone
 2nd Field CIS Company, in Dublin
 2nd Military Police Company, in Dublin

Defence Forces Training Centre 

The Defence Forces Training Centre (DFTC) based at the Curragh Camp is provides professional training to the Irish Army:

  Defence Forces Training Centre, in Curragh
 Military College
 Command and Staff School
 Cadet School
 Infantry School
 Officer Training Wing
 Non Commissioned Officer Training Wing
 Infantry Weapons Wing
 Artillery School
 Cavalry School
 United Nations Training School Ireland
 Military Administration School
 Defence Forces Physical Education School
 CIS Group
 Communications and Information Services School
 Engineer Group
 Military Engineering School
 Ordnance Group
 Ordnance School
 Military Police Group
 Military Police School
 Transport Group
 Transport and Vehicle Maintenance School
 Medical School
 Defence Forces Catering School
 Central Medical Unit Detachment
 Defence Forces Training Centre Military Police Company
 Defence Forces Training Centre Support Unit

Army Reserve 
The Army Reserve is a part-time, voluntary organisation established on 1 October 2005, whose members round out regular army units. The Army Reserve is present at the following locations:

 1st Brigade, in Cork
 C Company, 1st Infantry Battalion, in Clifden
 D Company, 1st Infantry Battalion, in Galway
 E Company, 1st Infantry Battalion, in Ennis
 C Company, 3rd Infantry Battalion, in Kilkenny
 D Company, 12th Infantry Battalion, in Mallow
 E Company, 12th Infantry Battalion, in Tralee
 F Company, 12th Infantry Battalion, in Skibbereen
 C Company, 12th Infantry Battalion, in Limerick
 D Company, 3rd Infantry Battalion, in Templemore
 E Company, 3rd Infantry Battalion, in Wexford
 F Company, 3rd Infantry Battalion, in Waterford
 4th and 5th Artillery Battery, 1st Artillery Regiment, 2x Cavalry Squadron Troops, 1x CIS Radio Platoon, 2x Transport Platoons, 1x Military Police Platoon, in Cork
 2nd Brigade, in Dublin
 C Company, 6th Infantry Battalion, in Mullingar
 D Company, 6th Infantry Battalion, in Castlebar
 E Company, 6th Infantry Battalion, in Boyle
 D Company, 7th Infantry Battalion, 2x Cavalry Squadron Troops, 1x CIS Radio Platoon, 2x Transport Platoons, 1x Military Police Platoon, in Dublin
 E Company, 7th Infantry Battalion, in Bray
 C Company, 27th Infantry Battalion, in Cavan
 D Company, 27th Infantry Battalion, in Dundalk
 E Company, 27th Infantry Battalion, in Navan
 C Company, 28th Infantry Battalion, in Letterkenny
 D Company, 28th Infantry Battalion, in Sligo
 E Company, 28th Infantry Battalion, in Donegal
 4th and 5th Artillery Battery, 2nd Artillery Regiment, 1x Field Engineer Platoon, in Athlone
 Defence Forces Training Centre, in Curragh
 various units, in Curragh

Infantry battalion organization 

The infantry battalions of the Irish Army are organized as follows:

 Infantry Battalion
 Headquarters Company
 Administrative Platoon
 Communications Platoon
 Transport Platoon
 Logistic Platoon
 3x to 6x Infantry companies
 3x Infantry platoons
 Weapons Platoon, with M1 60mm mortars, FN MAG machine guns, and 84mm recoilless rifles
 Support Company
 Reconnaissance Platoon, includes a Sniper section
 Heavy Machine Gun Platoon, with M2 Browning heavy machine guns
 Anti-armour Platoon, with Javelin anti-tank missiles
 Mortar Platoon, with LLR 81mm mortars

Air Corps 
The Air Corps is the air branch of the Irish Defence Forces. Headed by a brigadier general it comprises a staff headquarters, two operational wings, two support wings, one independent squadron and the Air Corps College.

  Air Corps Headquarters, at Casement Aerodrome in Baldonnel
 Office of General Officer Commanding
 Operations Section
 Support Section
 Military Airworthiness Authority
 Flight Safety Section
 Military Police Section
 CIS Squadron (former 501 CIS Squadron, No 5 Support Wing)
 Squadron Headquarters
 Airfield Services Flight
 Communications Flight
 Technical Services Flight
 Information Technology Flight

No 1 Operations Wing 

No 1 Operations Wing operates the fixed-wing assets of the Air Corps. The wing is divided into four flying and two non-flying squadrons:

 No 1 Operations Wing, at Casement Aerodrome in Baldonnel
 101 Maritime Surveillance and Airlift Squadron, with 2x CN-235 MPA maritime patrol aircraft (to be replaced by 2x C-295 MPA)
 102 Ministerial Transport Squadron, with 1x Learjet 45 plane
 103 Garda Air Support Unit, with 1x Defender plane
 104 Army Co-op and Reconnaissance Squadron, with 4x PC-12NG planes
 105 Defence Forces Photographic Section
 106 Maintenance Squadron

No 3 Operations Wing 

No 3 Operations Wing is operates all Air Corps helicopters, and is divided into three squadrons. It provides pilots for the Emergency Aeromedical Service, the air ambulance service which is jointly operated by the Air Corps and the HSE National Ambulance Service.

 No 3 Operations Wing, at Casement Aerodrome in Baldonnel
 301 Tactical Helicopter Squadron, with 6x AW139 helicopters
 302 Training and Surveillance Squadron, with 2x EC135 P2 helicopters, and 2x EC135 T2 helicopters for the Garda Air Support Unit (Detachment at Finner Camp)
 303 Maintenance Squadron

No 4 Support Wing 
No 4 Support Wing carries out second line maintenance and manages the procurement of spares and aviation fuel. This formation has two squadrons.

 No 4 Support Wing, at Casement Aerodrome in Baldonnel
 401 Mechanical Support Squadron
 402 Avionics Support Squadron

No 5 Support Wing 
No 5 Support Wing is responsible for the logistic support for the Air Corps and the management and security of Casement Aerodrome.

 No 5 Support Wing, at Casement Aerodrome in Baldonnel
 502 Logistics Squadron
 503 Transport Squadron
 504 Medical Squadron
 505 Air Traffic Control Squadron
 506 Crash Rescue Squadron
 507 Security and Maintenance Squadron

Air Corps College 

The Air Corps College is the principal training unit of the Irish Air Corps, where all entrants into the service undertake their training. The College is divided into three distinct schools:

 Air Corps College, at Casement Aerodrome in Baldonnel
 Flying Training School, pilot and officer training, with PC-9 trainer aircraft
 Technical Training School, aircraft technicians training
 Military Training and Survival School, basic military, Non-commissioned Officer, and SERE training

Naval Service 
The Naval Service is the sea branch of the Irish Defence Forces. Headed by a brigadier general it comprises a staff headquarters, two commands, and the Naval College.

  Naval Headquarters, at Haulbowline Naval Base

Naval Operations Command 

Naval Operations Command is the command component of the Irish Naval Service responsible for all day-to-day activities of the service, both at sea and on shore.

 Naval Operations Command, at Haulbowline Naval Base
 Operations Command Headquarters
 Fleet Operational Readiness Standards and Training
 LÉ Eithne (P31), LÉ Orla (P41) (in operational reserve), LÉ Ciara (P42), LÉ Róisín (P51), LÉ Niamh (P52), LÉ Samuel Beckett (P61), LÉ James Joyce (P62), LÉ William Butler Yeats (P63), and LÉ George Bernard Shaw (P64)
 Intelligence and Fishery Section
 Naval Intelligence Cell
 Navigation Cell
 Naval Computer Centre
 Fisheries Monitoring Centre
 Vessel Monitoring System
 Fishery Protection System - Lirguard
 Fishery Information System
 Fishery Geographic System
 Fishery Legislative System
 Electronic Recording and Reporting System
 Shore Operations
 Headquarters Section
 Naval Service Operations Room
 Naval Service Reserve Staff
 Naval Base Communications Centre
 Operations Security Section
 Naval Service Diving Section
 Harbour Master Naval Base
 Boat Transport

Naval Support Command 

Naval Support Command oversees the personnel, logistical and technical resources of the Naval Service, allowing the service to meets its operational and training commitments. Ship procurement, maintenance, repair, provisions, ordnance, food, fuel, personnel and transportation are handled by Naval Support Command.

 Naval Support Command, at Haulbowline Naval Base
 Support Command Headquarters
 Personnel Management Section
 Maintenance Management/Planning and Inspectorate
 Mechanical Engineering and Naval Dockyard Unit
 Plant and Machinery Section
 Naval Dockyard
 Base Logistic Department
 Naval Technical Stores
 Central Supply Unit
 Accommodation and Messes Section
 Base Engineering Maintenance Section
 Road Transport Section
 Weapons Electrical Unit
 Communications Technical Section
 Electrical/Electronics Section
 Ordnance Section

Naval College 
The Naval College provides training to cadets, non-commissioned officers, and recruits of the Naval Service. The Naval College trains and educates personnel for service, providing a mixture of different courses ranging from officer training right through to Naval Engineering. The Naval College is based out of the Naval Service's headquarters at Naval Base Haulbowline but also provides classes and lessons in non-military naval training at the nearby National Maritime College of Ireland in Ringaskiddy.

 Naval College, at Haulbowline Naval Base
 Officer Training School
 Military and Naval Operational Training School
 School of Naval Engineering

Naval Service Reserve 
The Naval Service Reserve is the reserve force of the Naval Service. Its personnel supplements the crew of vessels of the Naval Service during operations, and conducts stand-alone operations within their respective ports, such as security duties, sighting reports and intelligence gathering.

 Naval Service Reserve, at Haulbowline Naval Base
 Dublin Unit Naval Service Reserve, in Dublin
 Waterford Unit Naval Service Reserve, in Waterford
 Cork Unit Naval Service Reserve, in Cork
 Limerick Unit Naval Service Reserve, in Limerick

Defence Forces structure graphic

Geographic distribution of units

References

External links
 Website of the Irish Defence Forces

Irish Defence Forces